Gavampati is a supplementary Mon language chronicle that covers legendary early history. H.L. Shorto dates the only extant palm-leaf manuscript to c. 1710, and translated it into English in his article called "Gavampati Tradition." However Michael Aung-Thwin points out some of the terms in the text are decidedly early 19th century, and some or all of Gavampati may have been added during or shortly after First Anglo-Burmese War (1824–1826).

Notes

References

Bibliography
 

Burmese chronicles
Burmese Buddhist texts